The Brown House is a historic house at 1604 Caldwell Street in Conway, Arkansas.  It is a -story wood-frame structure, with Colonial Revival and Queen Anne features.  It has a tall hip roof, from with gables project, some finished in decoratively cut shingles.  It has a wraparound porch supported by Ionic columns with a balustrade of urn-shaped spindles.  It was designed by prolific Arkansas architect Charles L. Thompson and built about 1900.

The house was listed on the National Register of Historic Places in 1982.

References

Houses on the National Register of Historic Places in Arkansas
Colonial Revival architecture in Arkansas
Houses completed in 1904
Houses in Conway, Arkansas
National Register of Historic Places in Faulkner County, Arkansas
Individually listed contributing properties to historic districts on the National Register in Arkansas